The 1981–82 Magyar Kupa (English: Hungarian Cup) was the 42nd season of Hungary's annual knock-out cup football competition.

Final

See also
 1981–82 Nemzeti Bajnokság I

References

External links
 Official site 
 soccerway.com

1981–82 in Hungarian football
1981–82 domestic association football cups
1981-82